FTC may refer to:

Commerce 
 Fair Trade Commission (disambiguation)
 Federal Trade Commission, an American antitrust and consumer protection agency
 FTC Kaplan, or Financial Training Company, a former name of Kaplan Financial Ltd, a financial training institution in the United Kingdom

Entertainment 
 Fashion Television Channel, a Canadian television channel

Science, mathematics, and technology 
 Emtricitabine, an antiretroviral drug used to treat HIV, coded FTC in medical journals
 Fault-tolerant computer system
 FIRST Tech Challenge, a robotics competition for students 
 Follicular thyroid cancer, a type of cancer
 Fundamental theorem of calculus, a mathematical theorem
 Fusion Technology Center, a research organisation in South Korea

Other uses 
 Fairfield Transportation Center
 Federal Transfer Center, part of the United States Federal Bureau of Prisons
 Ferencvárosi TC, a Hungarian sports club
 Free the Children, an international children's rights and development organization
 Free Tibet Campaign, a British human rights organizations
 RAF Flying Training Command, within the United Kingdom Royal Air Force